In econometrics, the autoregressive conditional heteroskedasticity (ARCH) model is a statistical model for time series data that describes the variance of the current error term or innovation as a function of the actual sizes of the previous time periods' error terms; often the variance is related to the squares of the previous innovations. The ARCH model is appropriate when the error variance in a time series follows an autoregressive (AR) model; if an autoregressive moving average (ARMA) model is assumed for the error variance, the model is a generalized autoregressive conditional heteroskedasticity (GARCH) model.

ARCH models are commonly employed in modeling financial time series that exhibit time-varying volatility and volatility clustering, i.e. periods of swings interspersed with periods of relative calm. ARCH-type models are sometimes considered to be in the family of stochastic volatility models, although this is strictly incorrect since at time t the volatility is completely pre-determined (deterministic) given previous values.

Model specification

To model a time series using an ARCH process, let denote the error terms (return residuals, with respect to a mean process), i.e. the series terms. These  are split into a stochastic piece  and a time-dependent standard deviation  characterizing the typical size of the terms so that

The random variable  is a strong white noise process. The series  is modeled by

,

An ARCH(q) model can be estimated using ordinary least squares. A method for testing whether the residuals  exhibit time-varying heteroskedasticity using the Lagrange multiplier test was proposed by Engle (1982). This procedure is as follows:

 Estimate the best fitting autoregressive model AR(q) .
 Obtain the squares of the error  and regress them on a constant and q lagged values:
 
 where q is the length of ARCH lags.
The null hypothesis is that, in the absence of ARCH components, we have  for all . The alternative hypothesis is that, in the presence of ARCH components, at least one of the estimated  coefficients must be significant. In a sample of T residuals under the null hypothesis of no ARCH errors, the test statistic T'R² follows  distribution with q degrees of freedom, where  is the number of equations in the model which fits the residuals vs the lags (i.e. ). If T'R² is greater than the Chi-square table value, we reject the null hypothesis and conclude there is an ARCH effect in the ARMA model. If T'R² is smaller than the Chi-square table value, we do not reject the null hypothesis.

GARCH

If an autoregressive moving average (ARMA) model is assumed for the error variance, the model is a generalized autoregressive conditional heteroskedasticity (GARCH) model.

In that case, the GARCH (p, q) model (where p is the order of the GARCH terms  and q is the order of the ARCH terms  ), following the notation of the original paper, is given by

Generally, when testing for heteroskedasticity in econometric models, the best test is the White test. However, when dealing with time series data, this means to test for ARCH and GARCH errors.

Exponentially weighted moving average (EWMA) is an alternative model in a separate class of exponential smoothing models. As an alternative to GARCH modelling it has some attractive properties such as a greater weight upon more recent observations, but also drawbacks such as an arbitrary decay factor that introduces subjectivity into the estimation.

GARCH(p, q) model specification

The lag length p of a GARCH(p, q) process is established in three steps:

 Estimate the best fitting AR(q) model
 .
 
Individual values that are larger than this indicate GARCH errors. To estimate the total number of lags, use the Ljung–Box test until the value of these are less than, say, 10% significant. The Ljung–Box Q-statistic follows  distribution with n degrees of freedom if the squared residuals  are uncorrelated. It is recommended to consider up to T/4 values of n. The null hypothesis states that there are no ARCH or GARCH errors. Rejecting the null thus means that such errors exist in the conditional variance.

NGARCH

NAGARCH

Nonlinear Asymmetric GARCH(1,1) (NAGARCH) is a model with the specification:
,
For stock returns, parameter  is usually estimated to be positive; in this case, it reflects a phenomenon commonly referred to as the "leverage effect", signifying that negative returns increase future volatility by a larger amount than positive returns of the same magnitude.

This model should not be confused with the NARCH model, together with the NGARCH extension, introduced by Higgins and Bera in 1992.

IGARCH

Integrated Generalized Autoregressive Conditional heteroskedasticity (IGARCH) is a restricted version of the GARCH model, where the persistent parameters sum up to one, and imports a unit root in the GARCH process. The condition for this is

.

EGARCH

The exponential generalized autoregressive conditional heteroskedastic (EGARCH) model by Nelson & Cao (1991) is another form of the GARCH model. Formally, an EGARCH(p,q):

This is particularly useful in an asset pricing context.

Since  may be negative, there are no sign restrictions for the parameters.

GARCH-M

The GARCH-in-mean (GARCH-M) model adds a heteroskedasticity term into the mean equation. It has the specification:

The residual  is defined as:

QGARCH

The Quadratic GARCH (QGARCH) model by Sentana (1995) is used to model asymmetric effects of positive and negative shocks.

In the example of a GARCH(1,1) model, the residual process  is

where  is i.i.d. and

GJR-GARCH

Similar to QGARCH, the Glosten-Jagannathan-Runkle GARCH (GJR-GARCH) model by Glosten, Jagannathan and Runkle (1993) also models asymmetry in the ARCH process. The suggestion is to model  where  is i.i.d., and

where  if , and  if .

TGARCH model

The Threshold GARCH (TGARCH) model by Zakoian (1994) is similar to GJR GARCH. The specification is one on conditional standard deviation instead of conditional variance:

where  if , and  if . Likewise,  if , and  if .

fGARCH

Hentschel's fGARCH model, also known as Family GARCH, is an omnibus model that nests a variety of other popular symmetric and asymmetric GARCH models including APARCH, GJR, AVGARCH, NGARCH, etc.

COGARCH

In 2004, Claudia Klüppelberg, Alexander Lindner and Ross Maller proposed a continuous-time generalization of the discrete-time GARCH(1,1) process. The idea is to start with the GARCH(1,1) model equations

and then to replace the strong white noise process  by the infinitesimal increments  of a Lévy process , and the squared noise process  by the increments , where

The result is the following system of stochastic differential equations:

Now given some initial condition , the system above has a pathwise unique solution  which is then called the continuous-time GARCH (COGARCH) model.

ZD-GARCH

Unlike GARCH model, the Zero-Drift GARCH (ZD-GARCH) model by Li, Zhang, Zhu and Ling (2018)  lets the drift term  in the first order GARCH model. The ZD-GARCH model is to model , where  is i.i.d., and

The ZD-GARCH model does not require , and hence it nests the Exponentially weighted moving average (EWMA) model in "RiskMetrics". Since the drift term , the ZD-GARCH model is always non-stationary, and its statistical inference methods are quite different from those for the classical GARCH model. Based on the historical data, the parameters  and  can be estimated by the generalized QMLE method.

Spatial GARCH

Spatial GARCH processes by Otto, Schmid and Garthoff (2018)  are considered as the spatial equivalent to the temporal generalized autoregressive conditional heteroscedasticity (GARCH) models. In contrast to the temporal ARCH model, in which the distribution is known given the full information set for the prior periods, the distribution is not straightforward in the spatial and spatiotemporal setting due to the interdependence between neighboring spatial locations.

The spatial weight matrix defines which locations are considered to be adjacent.

Gaussian process-driven GARCH
In a different vein, the machine learning community has proposed the use of Gaussian process regression models to obtain a GARCH scheme. This results in a nonparametric modelling scheme, which allows for: (i) advanced robustness to overfitting, since the model marginalises over its parameters to perform inference, under a Bayesian inference rationale; and (ii) capturing highly-nonlinear dependencies without increasing model complexity.

References

Further reading

 (the paper which sparked the general interest in ARCH models)

 (a short, readable introduction)

Nonlinear time series analysis
Autocorrelation